The Mayor of Busan is the head of the local government of Busan who is elected to a four-year term.

List of mayors

Appointed mayors (before 1995) 
From 1946 to 1995, the Mayor of Busan was appointed by the President of the Republic of Korea.

Directly elected mayors (1995–present) 
Since 1995, under provisions of the revised Local Government Act, the Mayor of Busan is elected by direct election.

Elections 
Source:

1995

1998

2002

2004 (by-election)

2006

2010

2014

2018

2021 (by-election)

2022

See also 
Government of South Korea
Politics of South Korea

References 

 
Busan
Lists of political office-holders in South Korea